Events in the year 1924 in Norway.

Incumbents
Monarch – Haakon VII

Events
 The 1924 Parliamentary election takes place.
 Kringkastningselskapet A/S was founded. This was the predecessor to the Norwegian Broadcasting Corporation, established in 1933
Geitungen Lighthouse is established.
Munck Cranes company is founded.
Ny Tid begins publishing.
Salhus Church is completed.

Popular culture

Sports

Music

Film

Literature

Notable births

January
5 January – Ottar Dahl, historian and historiographer (died 2011)
17 January – Bjørn Gundersen, high jumper (died 2002)
18 January – Gudrun Tandberg Høykoll, politician (died 2005)
24 January – Gunnar Thorleif Hvashovd, politician (died 2001)
21 January – Arne Nilsen, politician and minister (died 2020)
27 January – Knut Hoem, politician and minister (died 1987)

February
3 February – Ivar Ramstad, discus thrower (died 2009)
3 February – Johan Syrstad, politician (died 2019)
5 February – Viktor Olsen, marathon runner
5 February – Thor Støre, politician (died 2001)
9 February – Andreas Hagen, newspaper editor (died 2011)
13 February – Arne Tjersland, politician (died 2015)
16 February – Haaken Christensen, art historian, art collector and gallerist (died 2008).
19 February – Borghild Niskin, alpine skier (died 2013)
23 February – Per G. Schøyen, diplomat (died 2017)
28 February – Oddvar Vormeland, educationalist and civil servant (died 2013)

March

2 March – Arne Sandnes, politician (died 2016)
5 March – Johan Østby, politician (died 2005)
11 March – Sverre Oddvar Andresen, politician (died 1994)
23 March – Bjørn G. Andersen, geologist and academic (died 2012)
30 March – Reidar Berg, bobsledder (died 2018)

April

7 April – Espen Skjønberg, actor (died 2022)
10 April – Erik Himle, civil servant, politician and Minister (died 2008)
19 April – Mary Eide, politician (died 2013)
19 April – Gunnar Garbo, journalist, politician and ambassador (died 2016)
20 April – Sverre Johan Juvik, politician (died 2015)
22 April  – Thorbjørn Svenssen, international soccer player (died 2011)
26 April – Finn Isaksen, politician and Minister (died 1987)

May
10 May – Anders Hveem, bobsledder (died 2005)
11 May – Lars Ketil Strand, forester and professor (died 2020)
20 May – Odd Abrahamsen, poet (died 2001)
23 May – Ragnar Halvorsen, businessperson (died 2019)

June

1 June – Willy Ovesen, civil servant (died 2015)
3 June – Ingrid Espelid Hovig, television chef and cookery writer (died 2018)
8 June – Gunnar Brøvig, politician (died 1965)
8 June – Dagfinn Vårvik, politician and Minister (died 2018)
26 June – Birger Leirud, high jumper (died 1999)
30 June – Mattis Mathiesen, photographer and film director (died 2010)

July
4 July – Julius Paltiel, Holocaust survivor (died 2008)
11 July – Eleonore Bjartveit, politician and Minister (died 2002)
15 July – Lars Aspeflaten, politician (died 2010)
22 July – Signe Marie Stray Ryssdal, politician and Supreme Court lawyer (died 2019)

August

14 August – Sverre Fehn, architect (died 2009)
15 August – Jo Benkow, politician and writer and President of the Parliament (died 2013)
19 August – Karl Egil Aubert, mathematician (died 1990)
25 August – Ingvald Ulveseth, politician (died 2008)
31 August – Thor Pedersen, rower and Olympic bronze medallist (died 2008)

September

1 September – Christian Fredrik Borchgrevink, physician.
2 September – Egil Bergsland, politician (died 2007)
18 September – Sverre Helland, politician (died 2007)
27 September – Magnar Estenstad, cross country skier and double Olympic medallist (died 2004)
27 September – Kolbjørn Stordrange, politician (died 2004)

October
3 October – Nils Retterstøl, professor of psychiatry (died 2008)
18 October – Egil Hovland, composer (died 2013)

November
19 November – Knut Steen, sculptor (died 2011)

December
8 December – Hans Haga, agrarian leader (died 2008)
21 December – Tove Pihl, educator and politician (died 1987)

Notable deaths

14 January – Arne Garborg, writer (born 1851)
19 January – Christian Skredsvig, painter and writer (born 1854)
3 February – Axel Christian Zetlitz Kielland, civil servant and diplomat (born 1853)
4 February – Nordal Wille, botanist (born 1858)
11 February – Olav Nygard, poet (born 1884)
4 March – Leif Erichsen, sailor and Olympic silver medallist (born 1888)
3 April – Anders Krogvig, librarian, writer, literary consultant and critic (born 1880)
11 April – Minda Ramm, novelist, translator and literary critic (born 1859).
21 May – Hans Gabriel Nissen Buck, physician and politician (born 1848)
22 May – Herbjørn Gausta, artist (born 1854)
21 May – Paul Andreas Jetmundsen Aklestad, politician (born 1837)
18 July – Anton Aure, bibliographer (born 1884).
August – Sofus Arctander, politician and Minister (born 1845)
29 September Ragna Vilhelmine Nielsen, pedagogue and feminist (born 1845)
10 October – Edvard Liljedahl, politician and Minister (born 1845)
8 December – Carl Anton Larsen, mariner and Antarctic explorer (born 1860)

Full date unknown
Karl Anton Sanderød, politician (born 1855)

See also

References

External links